Saints Behnam, Sarah, and the Forty Martyrs were 4th-century Christians who suffered martyrdom during the reign of Shapur II. They are venerated as saints in the Oriental Orthodox Church.

Biography
According to their hagiography, Behnam and Sarah were born in the 4th century, and were the children of Sennacherib, King of Assyria, who ruled under the Shahanshah Shapur II of Iran. Whilst hunting with forty slaves, Behnam was separated from his entourage, and was forced to spend the night in the wilderness. He received a dream in which an angel instructed him to seek Saint Matthew the Hermit on Mount Alfaf, as he could heal Behnam's sister Sarah, who was afflicted with leprosy. Behnam met with his entourage the next day, and they searched and discovered the hermit in a cave, where he explained Christianity to the prince. Behnam demanded proof, and Matthew told him to bring Sarah to him to be healed of her leprosy.

Behnam and his entourage returned to the city and told his mother of his dream and the saint. His mother allowed Behnam and Sarah to return to the saint in secret, and he healed Sarah of her leprosy, after which Behnam, Sarah, and the forty slaves were baptised. Matthew used water from a spring that appeared after he hit the ground with his staff. The king learned of his children's conversion and threatened to punish them if they did not abandon Christianity. Stalwart in their faith, Behnam, Sarah, and the forty slaves, fled to Mount Alfaf, but were slain by soldiers sent by the king.

Sennacherib was afflicted by madness after the death of the martyrs. An angel appeared before Behnam's mother and told her the king would only be cured of his madness if he converted to Christianity and prayed at the site of the martyrs' death. Behnam's mother and Sennacherib followed the angel's instructions, and the king was cured. They were then baptised by Saint Matthew at Assur. At the request of Saint Matthew, Sennacherib constructed a monastery atop Mount Alfaf, that would later become known as the Monastery of Saint Matthew. The king also constructed a monument on the site of the martyrs' death called gubba ("pit" in Syriac). A wealthy pilgrim called Isaac later visited the site of the martyrs' death in the hope it would exorcise the devil from his servant, and constructed a monastery named as Beth Gubbe near Behnam's tomb upon receiving instructions to do so from the saint in a dream. This became known as the Monastery of Saints Behnam and Sarah.

Hagiography
The life of the martyrs is recorded in at least twenty Syriac manuscripts. The earliest surviving manuscript is named the History of Mar Behnam and Sarah. The German historian Gernot Wießner argued it was composed in Late Antiquity, but it has since been proven by more recent studies that it was written in 1197. It was written by an adherent of the Syriac Orthodox Church, and details of the saints' lives are also recorded in other Syriac manuscripts from the late 12th and early 13th centuries. The hagiography may have been written to establish the pre-Islamic foundation of the Monastery of Saints Behnam and Sarah, and thus prevent confiscation from Muslim rulers.

A mention of a church of Saint Behnam at Tripoli in 961 by Bar Hebraeus in his Chronography has been argued to suggest that an oral version of the saints' lives had existed prior to the earliest surviving manuscript. Two homilies on the martyrs named On the Martyrdom of Behnam and his Companions are known to have been written by Jacob of Serugh. The 15th century author Ignatius Behnam Hadloyo also wrote two poems on Behnam, of which five copies survive.

Names and places in the hagiography were derived from pre-existing traditions, as demonstrated by the name Sarah, which is known to be the traditional name given in Syriac hagiographies to the sister of a male martyr, such as the Saints Zayna and Sarah, and was derived from Sarah, wife of Abraham. Also, as a consequence of the Christianisation of Assyria, figures and sites from Assyrian history were integrated into Christian narratives, and thus Assur was mentioned as the place of the king's baptism, and the name Sennacherib used for Behnam and Sarah's father was inspired by the Assyrian king Sennacherib (r. 705-681 BC).

The French historian Jean Maurice Fiey noted that the Forty Martyrs of Bartella, the village near the monastery of Saints Behnam and Sarah in Iraq, are also commemorated on 10 December in the Martyrology of Rabban Sliba, composed in the late thirteenth century or early fourteenth century. Sarah is also separately commemorated in some Syriac Orthodox calendars on 22 November.

Relics
The relics of Behnam and Sarah are kept at the Monastery of Saints Behnam and Sarah in Iraq. Some relics of the saints are also contained in the Monastery of Saint Menas in Cairo. As well as this, the Syriac Orthodox Church of the Forty Martyrs at Mardin in Turkey purports to contain the remains of Saint Behnam.

References

Bibliography

Oriental Orthodox saints
4th-century births
4th-century deaths
4th-century Christian martyrs
Christians in the Sasanian Empire
People executed by the Sasanian Empire
Converts to Christianity from Zoroastrianism
Groups of Christian martyrs
Angelic visionaries
Mesopotamian saints